XHLI-FM is a radio station on 98.3 FM in Villahermosa, Tabasco, Mexico. It is owned by Grupo Radio Digital and carries its Radio Mexicana grupera format.

History
The original concession for XHLI was obtained on September 23, 1992, by Luis Illán Torralba, a longtime radio announcer in Villahermosa. Grupo Radio Digital became the concessionaire in 2006.

Most of GRD's stations dropped their MVS Radio franchised brands on May 1, 2021. Remaining a grupera station, XHLI briefly was known as "LI 98.3" until it adopted the "Radio Mexicana" name used by sister station XHONC-FM in Tuxtla Gutiérrez.

References

Radio stations in Tabasco
Villahermosa